Héctor Jiménez (born December 14, 1973) is a Mexican actor and producer. He played Esqueleto in Nacho Libre, Mr. Tumnus in Epic Movie and the cashier in Wild Hogs. He worked in a theater company in Tijuana for eight years, before moving to Mexico City to work for a Swiss company as a theater clown. In 2007, he was nominated in the MTV Movie Awards for Best Fight Scene. He is known in Hollywood circles as "The Mexican Steve Buscemi". On August 23, 2007, Jiménez appeared in the episode of the pre-schooler's show Yo Gabba Gabba! on Nick Jr. for the recurring Dancey Dance segment.

Filmography

Who Killed Sara? (2021) as Elroy (TV series)
Ruta Madre (2019)
Justice for All (2018)
Compadres (2016) as Guasa
Fachon Models (2014) El Charal
Suave Patria (2012)
El Santos vs. La Tetona Mendoza (2012) as Cabo Valdivia
Casa de Mi Padre (2012)
El Albergue (2012) as Bulgaro Antonio (TV series)
Cellmates (2011) as Emilio
Sharktopus (2010) as Bones
El infierno(2010) as Pancho Pistolas
Gentlemen Broncos (2009) as Lonnie
Sin Nombre (2009) as Leche/Wounded Man
Navidad SA (2008) as Chícharo
Killer Pad (2007) as Angel
Wild Hogs (2007) As Store Clerk
Epic Movie (2007) as Mr. Tumnus/Tony Fauntana
La Ventana de Luciano
Nacho Libre (2006) as Steven/Esqueleto
Punto de fuga (2006) as Héctor
Voces inocentes (2004) as Raton
Mezcal (2004) as Borracho joven
Supervivencia (1992)

References

External links

Interview @ about.com

1973 births
Living people
Mexican male film actors
People from Tijuana
Male actors from Baja California
21st-century Mexican male actors